Karak is a surname found in Indian state of Karnataka, West Bengal,  Gujarat, Bihar.

References

Surnames of Indian origin